Matalascañas (local dialect: [matalaʰ'kaɲa]) is the name of a beach and resort within the Municipality of Almonte, Province of Huelva, in southern Spain. It is known for having an ancient upside down tower on the sand
called Torre la Higuera, one of the seven defense towers built by Phillip II in the 16th century to protect the coast from incursions by Turkish and North African corsairs. This locale was still called by the tower's name until the 1970s. 
The Matalascañas coast line is surrounded by Doñana National Park (also called the Coto de Doñana), and was segregated from it in 1961 to allow the development of a beach-side tourist village. There were environmental protests about this development in the National park. Later, a proposed additional development at La Donana was stopped *. The beach itself is 7 kilometres long with an average width of 80 metres. You can walk unimpeded for several kilometres and even continue into the pristine beaches of Doñana National Park along the Gulf of Cádiz. The mild Mediterranean climate, fine golden sand of the beachfront, mobile dunes, and clean water attract tourists throughout the year; the summer nightlife is attractive to young people.

External links 

 Coping with Tourists: European Reactions to Mass Tourism 

Geography of the Province of Huelva
Beaches of Andalusia
Tourist attractions in Andalusia